Marek Krátký (born 8 June 1993) is a Czech football player who currently plays for SK Sokol Brozany. He has represented his country at youth international level.

References

External links
 
 

1993 births
People from Kadaň
Living people
Czech footballers
Association football defenders
Czech Republic youth international footballers
Czech Republic under-21 international footballers
FK Teplice players
AC Sparta Prague players
FK Ústí nad Labem players
FC Hradec Králové players
Czech First League players
Czech National Football League players
FK Baník Sokolov players
Sportspeople from the Ústí nad Labem Region